Joakim Henrik Tömmernes (born 28 August 1990) is a Swedish professional ice hockey defenceman who currently plays for and captain of Genève-Servette HC of the National League (NL). He was drafted by the Vancouver Canucks in the seventh round, 210th overall, of the 2011 National Hockey League Entry Draft. Tömmernes played four seasons with Frölunda HC in the Elitserien before moving to North America to join the Canucks minor league affiliate in Utica.

Known for his leadership skills, he has served as captain or alternate captain for several teams during his playing career, including captaining his country in 2021.

Playing career
Tömmernes played junior hockey Färjestad BK in the J18 Elit. In the 2006–07 season, his first with the team, Tömmernes, helped them win the J18 Allsvenskan championship. The following season he helped Färjestad back to the championship, where they finished second. Tömmernes led all South Division defencemen in assists and points. Before the 2008–09 season, Tömmernes moved to Frölunda HC in the J20 SuperElit once he became too old for the U18 team. He continued to contribute points from the blue line leading all South Division defenders in goals, assists, and points. He also made his Elitserien debut playing in 11 games with Frölunda's top team. In the off-season Tömmernes signed a two-year contract with Frölunda.

In the first year of his contract Tömmernes played four games in the J20 SuperElit recording a goal and an assist. For the majority of the season he played in the SHL and also played 23 games for Borås HC in the HockeyAllsvenskan while on loan from Frölunda. During the 2010–11 season Tömmernes suffered a knee injury in the opening game. He returned to play in 47 games registering a career high 20 points. Following the end of the season the National Hockey League's (NHL) Vancouver Canucks drafted Tömmernes in the seventh round, 210th overall, in the 2011 NHL Entry Draft. Despite being drafted Tömmernes agreed to return with Frölunda on a one-year contract. Tömmernes was injured again in the 2011–12 season, suffering a broken jaw. In 44 games he increased his goal production from three to five, but his overall point production fell to 14. He again signed a one-year contract extension with Frölunda at the season's end.

Following the completion of the 2012–13 season, Tömmernes and Vancouver agreed to terms on a three-year entry-level contract. He joined the Canucks for training camp and played in the preseason registering two assists. He failed to make the team and was assigned to Vancouver's American Hockey League (AHL) affiliate, the Utica Comets.

In the 2014–15 season, continuing with the Utica Comets but unable to earn a call-up to the Canucks, on 8 January 2015, Tömmernes was placed on unconditional waivers in order for a mutual termination of his NHL contract. On 11 January 2015, Tömmernes returned to Europe in signing for the remainder of the season with Finnish club, Tappara.

On 31 May 2017, Tömmernes agreed to a two-year contract with Genève-Servette HC of the National League (NL). He made his NL debut on 7 September 2017, at home against Lausanne HC. On 4 January 2019, Tömmernes was signed to a two-year contract extension by Geneva through the 2020/21 season, with an option for the 2021/22 season. On 25 May 2020, Tömmernes was signed to an early two-year contract extension by Servette through the end of the 2022/23 season.

Career statistics

Regular season and playoffs

International

Awards and honours

References

External links

1990 births
Borås HC players
Frölunda HC players
Genève-Servette HC players
Living people
Sportspeople from Karlstad
Swedish ice hockey defencemen
Tappara players
Utica Comets players
Vancouver Canucks draft picks
Ice hockey players at the 2022 Winter Olympics
Olympic ice hockey players of Sweden